The Blues for Alice changes, Bird changes, Bird Blues, or New York Blues changes, is a chord progression, often named after Charlie Parker ("Bird"), which is a variation of the twelve-bar blues.

The progression uses a series of sequential ii–V or secondary ii–V progressions, and has been used in pieces such as Parker's "Blues for Alice". Toots Thielemans's "Bluesette", Freight Trane written by pianist Tommy Flanagan, and Parker's "Confirmation" also have similar progressions. Nikka Costa's 1983 song "First Love" also featured the progression on  its chorus.

Structure
A simple blues progression, in C, is as follows:

A typical blues progression in jazz, in C, is as follows:

The Bird Blues progression, in C, is as follows:

In roman numeral analysis, this is represented by

{| class="wikitable" style="width:340px;"
|-
|style="width:25%;"| IM7
|style="width:25%;"| vii7   III7
|style="width:25%;"| vi7    II7
|style="width:25%;"| v7     I7 
|-
| IV7
| iv7    VII7
| iii7    VI7
| iii7  VI7
|-
| ii7
| V7
| IM7   VI7
| ii7     V7
|}
This can be viewed as a cycle of ii–V progressions leading to the IV chord (F7 in the key of C major), and the tritone substitution of the dominant chords leading by half-step to the V chord (G7 in C).

{| class="wikitable" style="text-align:left; width:340px;"
|-bgcolor="#DDD"
|width=25%| C:
|width=25%| Am:
|width=25%| G(m):
|width=25%| F:
|-
| IM7 || ii7     V7 || ii7      V7 || ii7      V7
|-bgcolor="#DDD"
| F: || E: || D: || D(m):
|-
| I7 || subii7 subV7 || subii7 subV7  || subii7 subV7
|-bgcolor="#DDD"
|colspan="4"| C:
|-
| ii7 || V7 || IM7    VI7 || ii7     V7
|-
|}

Sources

Charlie Parker
Chord progressions
Chord substitution
Jazz terminology